Stajićevo is a village in Serbia. It is located in the Zrenjanin municipality, in the Central Banat District, Vojvodina province. The village has a Serb ethnic majority (96.29%) and its population numbering 1,999 people (2002 census).

Name
Names in other languages: , .

History
Stajićevo was founded in 1922 and was settled by Serb families from Elemir, Aradac, Farkaždin, Ečka, Taraš, Kumane, Botoš, and Orlovat.  
Whole families  came in a new village, which is founded in park of count Lazar d’Echka, respectively it of his successor Felix d’Harnoncourt; the streets received those names, where they came from: Elemirski sokak (Elemir’ corner), Aradački sokak, Farkaždinski sokak, Taraški sokak, Kumanovski and Botoški sokak. Them guided orthodox priest with name Stajić from village Taraš and from him became name this new village. He is buried in Stajićevo on cemetery. 
Until 1925, about 200 houses was built, which were populated by 1,000 inhabitants of Serb ethnicity. In 1991, a notorious concentration camp was created by Serbs for Croatian POWs and civilians from Vukovar known as the Stajićevo camp (Logor Stajićevo). Former prisoners from Vukovar visited this place on farm Livade on 22. April, 2009.

Historical population

1961: 1,413
1971: 1,607
1981: 1,993
1991: 2,058
2002: 1,999

See also
List of places in Serbia
List of cities, towns and villages in Vojvodina

References
Slobodan Ćurčić, Broj stanovnika Vojvodine, Novi Sad, 1996.

External links 

Stajićevo

Populated places in Serbian Banat
Zrenjanin